Georges Marquet (18 September 1886, in Jemeppe-sur-Meuse – 27 March 1947, in Nice) was a Belgian hotel manager and owner of many luxurious hotels in Europe. He created the Compagnie Internationale des Grands Hôtels Européens, which later would be part of the Compagnie Internationale des wagons-lits group, created by his compatriote and inventor (among other things) of the Orient-Express, the Belgian Georges Nagelmackers.

After he had bought the most luxurious hotels of Madrid, Spain, namely, the Ritz Madrid and the Palace Hotel (today called Westin Palace), his son lived in Madrid and was in charge of the Ritz Madrid direction.

Georges Marquet was a member of the Belgian Parliament for the Liberal Party, from 1929 until 1936.

References 

20th-century Belgian businesspeople
1886 births
1947 deaths